Ignacio Martinez may refer to:

Ignacio Martínez (footballer) (born 1939), Mexican former football player and manager
Ignacio Martínez (tennis) (born 1972), Mexican former professional tennis player
Ygnacio Martínez (1774–1848), Alcalde of Yerba Buena